The Bohse Eurostar is a German car produced by Bohse Automobilbau from 1987 to 1989. The first EuroStars were based on the Mk1 Golf. These were still offered under the name Bohse Sprinter and only 30 were produced. The later EuroStar models were based on the Lada Riva and 200 were built.

Design 

The Euro-Star is a Lada 2105 which has been converted into an open leisure vehicle with a custom plastic body. The EuroStar has no doors, instead using large fabric panels. There is no rear window either as it has been replaced by a removable fabric panel. The EuroStar features two removable Targa roofs held down by rubber bands and has both a pickup bed and a small enclosed trunk in the rear. Mechanically, the EuroStar uses the same running gear as the Lada. Both the EuroStar and Sprinter shared the same body with the only exterior difference being the headlights and taillights, as the Sprinter's taillights came from the Volkswagen LT.

References 

Cars introduced in 1987
Pickup trucks
Cars of Germany
Convertibles
Cars discontinued in 1989